John Flynn (10 November 1891 – 22 August 1968) was an Irish Fianna Fáil politician who served as a Teachta Dála (TD) from 1932 to 1943 and 1948 to 1957.

A farmer by profession, he was first elected as a Fianna Fáil TD at the 1932 general election for the Kerry constituency. He was re-elected at the 1933 general election for the same constituency and he was elected for the Kerry South constituency at the 1937 and 1938 general elections.

He did not contest the 1943 and 1944 general elections. At the 1948 general election, he was elected as an independent TD, and was re-elected at the 1951 general election, also as an independent. He later re-joined Fianna Fáil.

During a 1952 Dáil debate, after John A. Costello had said "I made no reference to an Adoption of Children Bill", Oliver J. Flanagan of Fine Gael quipped "Deputy Flynn would be more qualified to do that". Flynn, who was not in the chamber at the time, interpreted this as an insulting innuendo, and later punched Flanagan in the Oireachtas restaurant. The Oireachtas Committee on Procedure and Privilege condemned the conduct of both TDs. 

Flynn was re-elected a Fianna Fáil TD at the 1954 general election. He stood as a Fianna Fáil candidate at the 1957 general election, but was not re-elected.

References

1891 births
1968 deaths
Fianna Fáil TDs
Independent TDs
Members of the 7th Dáil
Members of the 8th Dáil
Members of the 9th Dáil
Members of the 10th Dáil
Members of the 13th Dáil
Members of the 14th Dáil
Members of the 15th Dáil
Politicians from County Kerry
Irish farmers